Tamara Culibrk (born 29 November 1997) is an American tennis player.

Culibrk made her WTA main draw debut at the 2018 Silicon Valley Classic in the doubles draw partnering Sybille Gauvain.

Culibrk played college tennis at San Jose State University.

References

External links
 
 

1997 births
Living people
American female tennis players
San Jose State Spartans women's tennis players